RIBA European Awards are part of an award program by the Royal Institute of British Architects. Complemented by the RIBA National and International Awards, it rewards "the excellent work being done by RIBA members in the European Union outside the UK". Awarded annually, it is given to a varying number of buildings. They are judged by the RIBA Awards Group, and winners are eligible for the Stirling Prize.

Laureates

2014
RIBA European award winners in 2014 were:

2013
RIBA European award winners in 2013 were:

2012
RIBA European award winners in 2012 were:

2011
RIBA European award winners in 2011 were:

2010
RIBA European award winners in 2010 were:

2009

2008
RIBA European award winners in 2008 were:

2007
RIBA European award winners in 2007 were:

2006
RIBA European award winners in 2006 were:

2005
RIBA European award winners in 2005 were:

See also
 List of architecture prizes
 RIBA Award

References

Architecture awards
Royal Institute of British Architects